Todo Cambió (English: Everything Changed) is the debut studio album recorded by Mexican pop/rock band Camila, It was released by Sony BMG Norte on May 9, 2006 (see 2006 in music).  The album was mainly written and composed by the band members: Samo (voice), Pablo Hurtado (guitar), and Mario Domm (piano, voice, composer, and producer), and includes a blend of Rock en Español and Pop Latino.

It was released in Mexico on April 18, 2006, where it was eventually certified three-times platinum with sales over 300,000 units. In the United States the release date was set on May 9, 2006 and the album received a Disco De Platino certification by the Recording Industry Association of America on July 24, 2007. In Spain the album was released on May 13, 2008.

This album yielded eight singles, including: "Abrázame", "Coleccionista de Canciones", "Todo Cambió", "Sin Tu Amor", "Sólo Para Tí", "Yo Quiero", "Me Da Igual" and "Perderte de Nuevo". For the album release in Spain the first single chosen was "Todo Cambió" as the lead single.

Album recording
About the album composing and recording, the band declared that "they came out from a garage, the living room and the closet, not to compete, only to show little fragments of their lives through the music they make." While producing Reyli Barba's album, Mario Domm asked Samo to participate on backing vocals, and on those recording sessions decided to make a band. Pablo [Hurtado] had to make an audition for the gig of guitar player, and after that they wrote the songs for the album. Regarding the song style and inspiration, Mario Domm wanted to let people hear the music they were creating on their living rooms and to express how much joy they had performing together. Samo (a former church performer) found his inspiration watching television, singing along with other performers and "everything I learned its on this lyrics." Pablo Hurtado, the youngest member of the band, dedicates his lyrics to "weekend love affairs" and about the track "Me Da Igual" he says: "I wrote it on a very hard moment of my life, it is about a love that never happened."

Awards and recognition
The title track has been the recipient of many awards and nominations, including a Latin Grammy Award nomination for Song of the Year in 2007 and the Best Song award at the Premios Lo Nuestro 2008, where the band also won in the Group or Duo of the year field. For the Premios Juventud of 2008 the group received the following nominations: Red Hot Artist, Catchiest Tune ("Todo Cambió"), CD to die for (Todo Cambió: Special Edition), and won for Best Ballad ("Todo Cambió") and Favorite Pop Star. At the 2007 Latin Billboard Music Awards the band won for Duo or Group of the Year and Latin Pop Airplay Song of the Year ("Todo Cambió"). Also the album was nominated for Latin Album of the Year. Camila also won two awards at Los Premios MTV Latinoamérica for Best New Artist - North and Breakthrough Artist.

Track listing

U.S. track listing
The track listing from Billboard.

Special edition CD/DVD
On August 14, 2007, a Special edition of the album was released. It includes the track listing from the original release, with 3 acoustic tracks and a new song, "Sólo Para Ti", which was recorded for the soundtrack of the Mexican film "Cansada de Besar Sapos". A DVD was also included with the 4 music videos.

CD

DVD

Spain track listing
This information from La Higuera.

Brazilian version
For the Brazilian release, the same track listing as in Spain was included, but instead of the track "Yo Soy Quien", a re-recording of the single "Abrázame" with Brazilian singer Wanessa Camargo (who also wrote verses in Portuguese for the song), retitled as "Abrázame/Me Abrace", is track 13.

Personnel
Mario Domm — Piano, arranger, hammond organ, programming, vocals, didjeridu, Rhodes piano, realization, recording
Samo - Voice, Gospel Arrangements
Pablo Hurtado — Guitar, pedal steel, arranger, slide guitar, electronics, vocals, editing assistant
Freddy Cañedo — Arranger, bass
Gabriel Castañón — Digital editing, mixing, recording
Daniel Castillo — Vocals, assistant
Benny Faccone — Recording
Paul Forat — Executive producer, A&R
Carlos García — A&R
Bernie Grundman — Mastering
Jorge Juárez — Percussion
Peter Mokran — Mixing
Daniel Parra — Adaptation
Edy Vega — Arranger, drums
David West — Percussion
Seth Waldmann — Assistant
Ricardo Calderon — Photography

Charts and certifications

Charts

Certifications

References

2006 debut albums
Camila (band) albums
Spanish-language albums
Sony BMG Norte albums